Advisory Commission on Intergovernmental Relations may refer to:

In United States federal government
 U.S. Advisory Commission on Intergovernmental Relations

In United States state government
 Connecticut Advisory Commission on Intergovernmental Relations
 Indiana Advisory Commission on Intergovernmental Relations
 Louisiana Advisory Commission on Intergovernmental Relations
 North Dakota Advisory Commission on Intergovernmental Relations
 Tennessee Advisory Commission on Intergovernmental Relations
 Texas Advisory Commission on Intergovernmental Relations
 Virginia Advisory Commission on Intergovernmental Relations